Korouhev is a municipality and village in Svitavy District in the Pardubice Region of the Czech Republic. It has about 800 inhabitants.

Administrative parts
The village of Lačnov is an administrative part of Korouhev.

References

Villages in Svitavy District